Bagryana or Bagriana may refer to:
 4400 Bagryana, an asteroid
 Anna Bagriana (born 1981), a contemporary Ukrainian novelist, poet, playwright, and translator
 Elisaveta Bagryana (1893–1991), a Bulgarian poet and three-time Nobel Prize nominee

See also
 Ivan Bahrianyi (1906–1963), Ukrainian writer